St. Peter's Senior High School, or PERSCO, is a Roman Catholic boys' senior high school in the Eastern Region of Ghana. The school was established in 1957 by the Divine Word Missionaries (SVD). The school is located in the town of Nkwatia Kwahu on the Kwahu Ridge.

Academics Facilities

The academic side of the school, popularly referred to as the Class Side, is the site of classroom blocks, science laboratories, a computer laboratory, quiz room and administration block. The classroom blocks house the Science, Business, Visual Arts and General Arts classes .

The laboratories are used for science practicals for the mandatory science courses of Physics, Biology and Chemistry.

Dormitories

The school has five dormitory blocks housing six houses named after Roman Catholic saints who were associated with Africa or Black people.

Academics

The school offers four programs of studies - Visual Arts, General Arts, Science and Business. Until the introduction of the computerized placement system by the government for the placement of junior high graduates into secondary schools, the school conducted placement examinations for its first years.

The placement test was to make sure only the best students were selected to the science programs.

Sports

There is a football pitch, athletics oval, basketball and volleyball courts, hockey pitch, and tennis courts. Students have gone on to represent the Kwahu zone in the Super-Zonal sports festivals.

The school has produced the best basketball players in the Kwahu zone. Between 2000 and 2004 the school was the sole representative of the Kwahu zone in basketball at the Super Zonal games.

Features

Palm plantation

The school has two large palm plantations; one at the entrance of the school and the other at the mid-eastern side of the school. Apart from being a free source of palm fruits used to feed the student body, the plantation at the entrance also serves as a place where students receive and entertain their visitors.

School chapel

The chapel building can accommodate the entire student population. Sunday mass is attended by the student body and Catholic staff members. Catholic residents of the township also worship in the chapel. There are visits from the Bishop of the Koforidua Diocese under which the parish falls. Mass is officiated by the School Chaplain and sometimes by other priests who are usually members of the teaching staff.

School crocodiles

The school has two crocodiles which are considered as important components in the school's tapestry. The crocodiles are almost like the school's mascots and also serve as a tourist attraction to many first time visitors; most visitors visit the crocodile enclosure first before undertaking other businesses at the school premises. The welfare of the crocodiles is the responsibility of the school's wildlife club.

Notable alumni
Ken Attafuah - Ghanaian criminologist and head of the National Identification Authority
Osei Kyei Mensah Bonsu- Majority leader of parliament and Minister of Parliamentary affairs 
Professor Ebenezer Oduro Owusu-Vice Chancellor of the University of Ghana
Dr. Anthony Nsiah Asare - Director General, Ghana Health Service
Dr. Archibald Letsa - Volta Regional Minister of Ghana
Kwaku Kwarteng- Deputy Minister of Finance, Ghana
Kwabena Kwabena - Highlife Musician
John Ofori-Tenkorang - Director General of the Social Security and National Insurance Trust (SSNIT)
Selorm Adadevoh - chief executive officer of MTN Ghana, a subsidiary of MTN Group
Magnom- Musician and Music Producer
Gilbert Asante- Ghanaian Photographer

See also

 Education in Ghana
 List of senior high schools in Ghana
 Roman Catholicism in Ghana

References 

1957 establishments in Ghana
Boarding schools in Ghana
Boys' schools in Ghana
Divine Word Missionaries Order
Education in the Eastern Region (Ghana)
Educational institutions established in 1957
High schools in Ghana
Catholic secondary schools in Ghana